Kao Jung-Fang (Chinese: 高荣芳; born 30 October 1980) is a Taiwanese football referee who has been a full international referee for FIFA.

He also refereed at the regional league such as 2011 SEA Games.,2013 SEA Games.

References 

1980 births
Living people
Taiwanese football referees